Peter Daniels may refer to:

Peter T. Daniels (born 1951), scholar of writing systems
Peter Daniels (racing driver), NASCAR Weekly Series national champion in 2002
pseudonym of Fred Olen Ray (born 1954), American film director